Davide Castelli (born 30 August 1999) is an Italian footballer who plays as a forward  for  club Pro Patria.

In 2019, Castelli made the longlist for the Golden Boy award.

Club career
On 5 October 2020 he joined Serie C club Pro Patria on loan from Genoa, whom he had just joined. On 19 July 2021 he joined to Pro Patria permanently.

Club statistics

Club

Notes

References

1999 births
Living people
People from Clusone
Footballers from Lombardy
Italian footballers
Association football forwards
Serie C players
U.C. AlbinoLeffe players
Genoa C.F.C. players
Aurora Pro Patria 1919 players
Tercera División players
Villarreal CF C players
Italian expatriate footballers
Italian expatriate sportspeople in Spain
Expatriate footballers in Spain